The Mercedes-Benz Mannheim 350 replaced the W03/Typ 350 models in 1929. The structure originated by Ferdinand Porsche was modified by Hans Nibel.

Type Mannheim 350 (1929 - 1930) 
In contemporary records the car was also frequently identified according to the widely used period German generic naming conventions as the “Mercedes-Benz 14/70 PS”, reflecting its “fiscal” and “actual” horsepower respectively.

In essence the car followed the construction of the Mercedes-Benz W03.   However, the wheelbase was reduced by 230 mm (9 inches), and the vehicle even in standard form was a little lighter.   In addition to the “Tourer” (two-door four-seater cabriolet) body, the car was available as a four-door saloon and a “Pullman Limousine” 

The straight-six 3444 cc engine was carried over from the W03, delivering 70 PS (51 kW) to the rear wheels through a three-speed gear box controlled via a centrally mounted lever.
Both axles were rigid, suspended on semi-elliptical leaf springs.  Cable-operated brakes provided stopping power to all four wheels.   The stated maximum speed was 95 km/h (59 mph).

Type Mannheim 370 (1929 - 1935) 
Launched alongside the Mannheim 350 was the Mannheim 370.   In this form, the car had a straight-six 3689 cc.  Output of  75 PS (55 kW) was claimed.   The three-speed gear box was offered, at extra cost,  with a fourth higher ratio.   The maximum speed claimed for the Mannheim 370 was 100 km/h (62 mph)

Type Mannheim 370 K (WK10) (1930 - 1933) 
From 1930 the 370K was offered with a wheelbase shortened by 175 mm (7 inches).   

Only cabriolet bodied versions of the 370K were offered.   The reduced size of the car permitted a maximum speed of 105 km/h (65 mph) to be claimed.

Typ Mannheim 370 S (WS10) (1930 - 1933) 
Shorter still, on a wheelbase of just 2850 mm (112 inches) was the 370S, available only with roadster or sport-cabriolet bodies.  The maximum speed on these versions was stated as 115 km/h (71 mph).  In 1933 the manufacturers increased the compression ratio from 5.5:1 to 5.75:1 with a corresponding increase in power output to 78 PS (57.3 kW) at 3400 rpm

Typ Mannheim 380 S (WS10) (1932 - 1933) 
The 380S came on the standard  wheelbase, but the car was distinguished by its longer eight-cylinder side-valve engine.   Claimed output of the 3820 cc unit was 80 PS (59 kW).

Available with a choice of cabriolet bodies, the car, like its six-cylinder sibling, rode on two rigid axles suspended on semi-elliptical leaf springs.   A top speed of 120 km/h (75 mph) was claimed.

Typ 380 S (W19) (1932 - 1933) 
In most respects identical was a version of the car which appeared towards the end of the product run, the 380S (W19) incorporating swing axle rear suspension and a cross mounted leaf spring arrangement at the front. Reflecting the importance of the innovative suspension configuration, this model was given its own internal model number, W19, which differentiates it from the other members of the Mannheim line. This car can really be seen as a prototype for the car’s Type 380 (W22) successor.

A still higher compression ratio accounted for a claimed increase in output to 85 PS (62.5 kW)

Commercial
The cars were too large and expensive ever to sell in large numbers, though the Mannheim 370 broke the 1,000 units barrier.   Overall production was as follows:

W10 350:  .........65 cars
W10 370:  ......1,279 cars
W10 370 K:  ......243 cars
W10 370 S:  ......195 cars
W10 380 S:  .......94 cars
W19 380 S: ........20 cars

Succession
In 1933 the Mercedes Benz Mannheim 350/370s were replaced by the Type 290 (W18) and by the Type 380 (W22)

References
 Oswald, Werner: Mercedes-Benz Personenwagen 1886–1986, Motorbuch-Verlag Stuttgart 1987, 
 

W10
Rear-wheel-drive vehicles
Roadsters
1930s cars